Rahul B. Seth (born 29 October 1977) is an Indian voice actor, dubbing artist, R&B-singer-songwriter, producer and composer.

Dubbing career
Seth started off in around between 1994 and 1995 when he first came to Mumbai and his main interest was always into music and in the creative field. He started off with ad jingles and some backup vocal here and there. Then he discovered the hidden talent of voicing and dubbing and gradually embarked upon that journey. He's performed many Hindi dub-over roles for various foreign films and animation, movies, serials and character voices for ad films. And that's where He found his niche, his mark. He always had the inclination towards music so gradually he also branched out into singing for jingles, title songs and writing and now he has reached a state where he even produced his own jingles and title songs.

Dubbing roles

Animated series

Live action films

Animated films

References

1977 births
Living people
Indian male voice actors
Indian male playback singers
Indian rhythm and blues singers
Singers from Lucknow
Male actors from Lucknow